Eeti "Edvard" Olavi Nieminen (29 March 1927 – 13 April 2016) was a Finnish Nordic skier who competed during the 1950s.

He was born in Kivennapa, a territory of Finland at that time.

He finished eighth in the Nordic combined event and 21st in the 18 km cross-country skiing event at the 1952 Winter Olympics in Oslo.

Nieminen also finished sixth in the Nordic combined event at the 1954 FIS Nordic World Ski Championships in Falun.

Cross-country skiing results

Olympic Games

References

External links
18 km Olympic cross country results: 1948-52

1927 births
2016 deaths
People from Vyborg District
Olympic cross-country skiers of Finland
Olympic Nordic combined skiers of Finland
Nordic combined skiers at the 1952 Winter Olympics
Nordic combined skiers at the 1956 Winter Olympics
Cross-country skiers at the 1952 Winter Olympics
Finnish male cross-country skiers
Finnish male Nordic combined skiers
20th-century Finnish people